Scintillithex is a genus of moths in the family Geometridae. It contains only one species, Scintillithex glaucisparsa, which is found on Borneo and Peninsular Malaysia.

Subspecies
Scintillithex glaucisparsa glaucisparsa (Borneo)
Scintillithex glaucisparsa scintillulata (Prout, 1941) (Peninsular Malaysia)

References

External links
Natural History Museum Lepidoptera genus database

Moths described in 1887
Eupitheciini